Laëticia Bapté (born 8 February 1999) is a French track and field athlete. She is a three-time national champion in the 60m hurdles.

Career
From Fort-de-France, on the island of Martinique, Bapté won her first French title in the 60m hurdles at the 2021 French indoor championships, running a new personal best time of 7.93 to do so. She was selected for the 2021 European Athletics Indoor Championships where she reached the semi-finals.

She won the French national 60m hurdles title for a second time in 2022. Competing at the 2022 World Athletics Championships in Eugene, Oregon, Bapté reached the semi-finals of the 100m hurdles.

Bapté won a third French title over 60m hurdles in 2023. She was chosen to compete at the 2023 European Athletics Indoor Championships and reached the final with the second fastest time.

References

External links

1999 births
Living people
French female hurdlers
Martiniquais people
Martiniquais sportswomen
Black French sportspeople